St Peter's School is a co-educational secondary school and sixth form located in Huntingdon in the English county of Cambridgeshire.

History
St Peter's traces its origins back to a British School, established in 1871 on Grammar School Walk in the town centre. This school relocated to a new building at Brookside, built in 1905, and was known as Brookside School. In 1957 the school moved to its current site on St Peter's Road, opening as a secondary modern school. It later became a comprehensive school. In 2005 the school was granted specialist status as a Mathematics and Computing College.

Previously a foundation school administered by Cambridgeshire County Council, in August 2011 St Peter's School converted to academy status and is now sponsored by The Cam Academy Trust.

Academics
St Peter's School offers GCSEs and BTECs as programmes of study for pupils, while students in the sixth form have the option to study from a range of A Levels and further BTECs.

Notable former pupils
 David Bridges, footballer
 Kasey Douglas, footballer
 Anne-Marie Hutchinson, Lawyer

References

External links
St Peter's School official website

Academies in Cambridgeshire
Secondary schools in Cambridgeshire
Huntingdon